Gibson Donald Lewis, known as Gib Lewis (born August 22, 1936), is an American politician and political consultant from Fort Worth, Texas. He was the first person to be elected five times as Speaker of the Texas House of Representatives, but he did not seek reelection in 1992, in compliance with a plea bargain agreement connected with his misdemeanor conviction of a violation of Texas financial disclosure law.

Early life and education
Lewis was born in Oletha in Limestone County and raised in Mexia, Texas and Cleveland, Texas, where he graduated in 1955 from Cleveland High School. He then enrolled at Sam Houston State College. Lewis later enlisted in the United States Air Force and went on to serve as a B-52 aerial gunner. While stationed at Carswell Air Force Base, he continued his studies at Texas Christian University.

Career 
Lewis was discharged from the U.S. Air Force in 1961. He then took a job as a salesman for a paper company and three years later, opened his own firm specializing in pressure-sensitive labels and decals. It grew into a multimillion-dollar business. Lewis continues as president of Lewis Label Products, Inc., today, three decades after its founding.

Since leaving the state legislature, he has lobbied state government on behalf of private clients.

He is the namesake of the Gibson D. Lewis Health Science Library at the University of North Texas Health Science Center and the Gib Lewis Prison Unit in Woodville, Texas.

Politics
Lewis was elected Speaker in 1983 to succeed Bill W. Clayton of Springlake, Lamb County. He was a key figure in passing the 1984 education act, designed by Ross Perot and Democratic Governor Mark White, hailed at the time as one of the most sweeping public education reforms in Texas history. He was instrumental in the passage of the 1985 comprehensive Texas Water Plan. He later promoted legislation to combat crime, including stricter laws against drunk drivers. An avid sportsman, Lewis carried legislation creating the "Operation Game Thief" program and was a sponsor of the Uniform Game Management Act.

In 1969, Lewis was elected to the River Oaks City Council. He arrived the next year in Fort Worth, the county seat of Tarrant County.

In 1970, Lewis was elected to the House from Tarrant County. In 1973, he was named chairman of the House Natural Resources Committee. In 1977, he chaired the House Committee on Intergovernmental Affairs.

Criminal activity

Conviction on ethics charges
In January 1992, Lewis pleaded no contest to two charges alleging that he illegally accepted a gift from a prominent law firm in San Antonio, Texas, and failed to disclose the money on official financial reports filed with the state. As part of a plea bargain, Lewis agreed to not seek reelection and to pay a fine of $1,000 for each charge.

DWI arrest
In June 2009, Lewis was arrested in the capital city of Austin, on probable cause of driving while intoxicated. His breathalyzer test indicated a blood alcohol content (BAC) level of 0.16 g/dl, twice the legal limit in Texas, and over three times the "best practices" limit recommended by the World Health Organization.

Personal life 
Lewis is married to the former Sandra Majors. They have two daughters.

References

External links
 Lewis Label Products Company - A business founded by Lewis
 Gibson D. Lewis Health Science Library - The website of Lewis' namesake library
 Lewis Label to Sponsor the 2016 Zest Festival, Texas

1936 births
Living people
People from Limestone County, Texas
Sam Houston State University alumni
Texas Christian University alumni
People from Fort Worth, Texas
Speakers of the Texas House of Representatives
Democratic Party members of the Texas House of Representatives
People from Austin, Texas
American lobbyists
United States Air Force airmen